Nishi-Tawaramoto Station(西田原本駅) is a railway station in Tawaramoto, Nara, Japan, serving passengers traveling on Kintetsu Railway's Tawaramoto Line. It is 10.1 km (6.3 mi) from Shin-Ōji.

Lines 
 Kintetsu Railway
 Tawaramoto Line

Platforms and tracks

History
 1918 Apr. 16 - Tawaramoto Station was opened by the Yamato Railway, while another Tawaramoto Station was opened by the Osaka Electric Tramway in 1923.
 1944 Jan. 11 - Train services between Tawaramoto and Sakurai was discontinued.
 1958 The discontinued section between Tawaramoto and Sakurai was abandoned.
 1964 Oct. 1 - The Shigi Ikoma Electric Railway acquired the Yamato Railways.
 1964 Oct. 1 - The Kintetsu Railway acquired the Shigi Ikoma Electric Railway, then Tawaramoto Station was renamed to Nishi-Tawaramoto.
 2007 Apr. 1 - PiTaPa, a reusable contactless stored value smart card, has been available.

Gallery

External links
 

Railway stations in Japan opened in 1918
Railway stations in Nara Prefecture
Tawaramoto, Nara